Outage may refer to:
 Network outage
 Outing
 Power outage
 Sun outage

See also
Outrage (disambiguation)